Wasantha may refer to:

Wasantha Aluwihare (born 1962), Sri Lankan politician
Wasantha Karannagoda, Sri Lankan navy officer
Wasantha Senanayake (born 1973), Sri Lankan politician
L. G. Wasantha Piyatissa, Sri Lankan politician
Lakshman Wasantha Perera (born 1963), Sri Lankan politician
Wasantha Obesekere, Sri Lankan film director 

Sinhalese masculine given names